Lily Castel (born Alice van Acker on 10 April 1937) is a Belgian singer, best known for her participation with Jacques Raymond in the 1971 Eurovision Song Contest.

Early career 

Castel started out as a dancer before auditioning for television talent show Ontdek de Ster in 1958. She obtained regular work singing with orchestras, and through the 1960s appeared on television and performed internationally, including at the Sopot International Song Festival. In 1970, she toured with former Eurovision singer Lize Marke.

Eurovision Song Contest 
The 1971 selection process for the Belgian Eurovision entry had resulted in a comprehensive victory for the song "Goeiemorgen, morgen" ("Good Morning, Morning"), performed by Nicole & Hugo, to be the representative for the 16th Eurovision Song Contest, to take place on 3 April in Dublin. Less than a week before the contest however, Nicole fell ill with jaundice and the duo had to withdraw. As last-minute replacements, BRT drafted in Castel and Belgium's 1963 Eurovision veteran Jacques Raymond. It was a race against time for the pair, not least when they arrived in Dublin to find that the stage layout at the Gaiety Theatre was unsuitable for the routine they had rehearsed. In the circumstances they gave a creditable performance on the night, but "Goeiemorgen, morgen" was not greatly appreciated by the juries and finished in joint 14th place of 18 entries.

Later career 

Castel remains active, having been a successful performer in concerts and variety shows for many years.

References 

1937 births
Living people
Musicians from Ghent
20th-century Belgian women singers
20th-century Belgian singers
Eurovision Song Contest entrants for Belgium
Eurovision Song Contest entrants of 1971